The Fletcher FD-25 Defender was a light ground-attack aircraft developed in the United States in the early 1950s.

Design and development
Designed by John Thorp, the Defender was a conventional low-wing cantilever monoplane with fixed tailwheel undercarriage. Provision was made for two machine guns in the wings, plus disposable stores carried on underwing pylons. Construction throughout was all-metal, and the pilot sat under a wide perspex canopy.

Operational history
Three prototypes were built, two single-seaters and a two-seater, but no orders were placed by the US military. In Japan, however, Toyo acquired the rights to the design, and built around a dozen aircraft, selling seven (five single-seater attack versions and two two-seat trainers) to Cambodia, and four to Vietnam. One example (FD-25B JA3051) served with the Royal Thai Police.

Survivors
One example (FD-25B N240D) remains in an airworthy condition today and appeared at the EAA AirVenture Oshkosh airshow in 2010. Two (a single-seater and a two-seater) are on museum display at the Tokyo Metropolitan College of Industrial Technology in Japan.

Related development
The wing design of the Fletcher FU-24 aerial topdressing plane was loosely based on that of the FD-25 Defender. Almost 300 were built under licence in New Zealand from the mid-1950s and used for agricultural and skydiving operations.

Specifications

See also

References
Notes

Bibliography

Bridgeman, Leonard (ed.). Jane's All the World's Aircraft 1955–56. New York: The McGraw-Hill Book Company, Inc. 
Grandolini, Albert. "L'Aviation Royale Khmere: The first 15 years of Cambodian military aviation". Air Enthusiast (Bromley, UK: Fine Scroll) (Thirty-seven, September–December 1988): pp. 39–47. ISSN 0143-5450.
 Taylor, Michael J. H. Jane's Encyclopedia of Aviation. London: Studio Editions. 1989. p. 393. .
 World Aircraft Information Files. London: Bright Star Publishing, 1985, pp. File 894 Sheet 25.

External links

 Flivver Plane Totes Guns and Bombs November 1951 Popular Science article on FL-25—rest of article and photos on following page

FD-25
1950s United States attack aircraft
Single-engined tractor aircraft
Low-wing aircraft
Aircraft first flown in 1953